Super Rhino is a 2009 American computer animated comedy  direct-to-video short film, produced by Walt Disney Animation Studios and starring the characters from feature film Bolt. Directed by Nathan Greno, the short film picks up sometime after the conclusion of Bolt. The excitable and TV obsessed hamster Rhino finds out his friends Penny and Bolt have been kidnapped. Rhino has to save them from the evil Dr. Calico. The short inspires Bolt: The Video Game and is a spin-off to the fictional TV show featuring Bolt.

Super Rhino was included in the 2009 DVD and Blu-Ray release of Bolt.

Plot
Penny and Bolt have been captured by the evil Dr. Calico, suspended above a pool of lava, inside a heavily guarded warehouse on an island in the middle of nowhere - a base which is impenetrable to both people and dogs. Penny's father watches the events from his lab through a secret camera imbedded in Bolt's collar and worries that he cannot save her. Discovering that no man or dog can break into Dr. Calico's base, he turns to Rhino, who is watching TV in the background. In order to save Penny and Bolt, Rhino is put through the same procedure as Bolt to give him super-powers.

Rhino uses his newly found powers to fly across the sea and crash land outside the armed base encased in his ball. Rhino's battle with the guard is witnessed by Penny, Bolt and Dr. Calico from the inside, with helicopters and cars crashing into the side of the building. Rhino uses his heat-vision to create an opening in the wall.

Once inside, Rhino uses his eye-beams to defeat the armed guards and commandeers a flying missile, riding it like a surfboard to aim at Dr. Calico, though the missile misses. Instead, Rhino uses his "super squeak" (similar to Bolt’s "super bark") ability to finish the villain off. With Penny and Bolt saved, Rhino walks away.

Rhino is next seen on stage performing  "The Best of Both Worlds"; the theme song from Hannah Montana (by co-star Miley Cyrus), where it is revealed that Rhino has been dreaming his adventures all along. Mittens wakes him up, telling him that she's not a fan of his singing. The short ends with another dream sequence, this time about Rhino being selected by the President to defeat Calico once again.

Cast
 Mark Walton as Rhino
 Miley Cyrus as Penny
 Susie Essman as Mittens
 Malcolm McDowell as Dr. Calico
 Sean Donnellan as Penny's TV Dad
 Randy Savage as Thug

See also
 List of Disney Animated Shorts and Featurettes
 Walt Disney Animation Studios

References

External links
 

2009 short films
Bolt (franchise)
American animated comedy films
Computer-animated short films
2009 computer-animated films
American animated short films
2000s Disney animated short films
Films directed by Nathan Greno
Films scored by John Powell
Films about rodents
2000s English-language films
Animated films about mammals
Films produced by Clark Spencer
Films about dreams